Jennifer Ouellette (born May 17, 1964) is a science writer based in Los Angeles, California.

Life and career

Ouellette is the former director of the Science & Entertainment Exchange, an initiative of the National Academy of Sciences (NAS) designed to connect entertainment industry professionals with top scientists and engineers to help the creators of television shows, films, video games, and other productions incorporate science into their work: "The National Academy is hoping to basically foster this current trend in television and get more interactions between science and Hollywood, in the hopes of changing the way science and scientists are portrayed. ... We want Hollywood to basically help us inspire people and to get them interested in science and in rationalism so that they then go on to read more and become more educated."

She also served as Journalist in Residence at the Kavli Institute for Theoretical Physics in 2008 and worked in New Mexico with the Santa Fe Science Writing Workshop as an instructor in 2009.

From 1995 until 2004 she was a contributing editor of The Industrial Physicist magazine, published by the American Institute of Physics. On the Meet the Skeptics! podcast Ouellette's husband, physicist Sean Carroll, said "She was an English major with no science background whatsoever...while working as a freelance journalist in New York City she was hired by the American Physical Society after they found out that it was easier to teach physics to people who knew how to write than to teach writing to people who knew physics." She is currently a freelance writer contributing to a physics outreach dialogue with articles in a variety of publications such as Physics World, Discover magazine,  New Scientist,  Physics Today, The Wall Street Journal. and Quanta Magazine

Ouellette also participates in a variety of print and online interviews such as NPR's Science Friday, SETI radio with Seth Shostak, and panel discussions at The Amaz!ng Meeting,  Dragon Con,  Center for Inquiry, and the National Association of Science Writers.  She appeared on NOVA in 2008 and on The Late Late Show with Craig Ferguson on February 11, 2011 discussing her book The Calculus Diaries and winning a coveted Golden Mouth Organ. She also has a blog, "Cocktail Party Physics: Physics with a twist" where she and other female contributors chat about the latest science news. "You just tell entertaining stories and weave the science in and it’s a way of getting people familiar and interested in what is normally kind of a scary subject for them."

In September 2015, Ouellette announced a new role as Senior Science Editor for Gizmodo.

On March 30, 2018, the American Humanist Association awarded Oullette the
2018 AHA Humanist of the Year award.
During her May 18, 2018 acceptance speech at the AHA's conference in Las Vegas, Oullette spoke of her brother's struggle with and death from cancer. She spoke about doctors and medical professionals who "hide behind euphemisms and platitudes" that hinder end of life decision making, and about patients' need for frankness and honesty about their prognosis. She spoke about the suffering due to the limitations of the medical profession's current understanding of pain management and the need for research, and about her support for right-to-die legislation.

In August 2018, Ouellette announced a new role as a contributor for Ars Technica.  She is currently a senior writer at Ars.

Books

References

External links
 
 
 
 Science and Entertainment Exchange website

Living people
American science writers
American magazine editors
Women magazine editors
American skeptics
1964 births